The Kalibo Bridge III, also known as simply the Kalibo Bridge is a  two-lane highway bridge which spans the Aklan River and connects the municipalities of Kalibo and Lezo in Aklan, Philippines. It is part of the Kalibo Circumferential Road and was inaugurated on January 16, 2020.

References

Buildings and structures in Aklan
Bridges in the Philippines